The James Weldon House is a historic house in Augusta, Kentucky. It is an unaltered example of Gothic vernacular architecture.

The three bay frame house is distinguished by a center gable and lancet style window.   Side elevations have cornice returns and six-over-six windows.  The front elevation has two-over-two lights on the first floor and a transom window over front door. Other details include small circular attic vents in the side gables and a front porch added later. The roof is covered in ribbed metal. Foundation material is rubble limestone.

James W. Weldon was listed as the owner of record in 1877.  W.T. Fields acquired the property by 1884.

References

National Register of Historic Places in Bracken County, Kentucky
Houses on the National Register of Historic Places in Kentucky
Houses in Bracken County, Kentucky
Carpenter Gothic architecture in Kentucky
1870 establishments in Kentucky
Houses completed in 1870
Augusta, Kentucky